Kurt Schumacher (born December 26, 1952) is a former American football guard and tackle in the National Football League for the New Orleans Saints and the Tampa Bay Buccaneers. He was the 12th overall pick in the 1975 NFL Draft.

External links
NFL.com player page

References
stats on rbref.com
bucpower profile

1952 births
Living people
Players of American football from Cleveland
American football offensive guards
American football offensive tackles
Ohio State Buckeyes football players
New Orleans Saints players
Tampa Bay Buccaneers players